The Oneida First Nation is an Oneida First Nation in southern Ontario, and a member of the Six Nations of the Grand River. Its reserves include the shared reserves of Glebe Farm 40B and the Six Nations of the Grand River First Nation.

References

Oneida
First Nations governments in Ontario